
Silver dollar is a dollar coin made of silver or any white metal. See:

Spanish dollar
Dollar coin (United States)
Dollar (Hong Kong coin)
Canadian silver dollar

Silver dollar or dollar may also refer to:

 Silver certificate (United States)
 Silver dollar, a North American–style pancake.
 Silver dollar (fish), a name given to various fish species.

Geography
 Silver Dollar, Ontario, a community in Ontario, Canada.
 Silver Dollar City, a theme park in Missouri, United States.

People 
 Sylvestro Carolla, New Orleans gangster known as "Silver Dollar".
 James Marion West, Jr., Texas oilman known as "Silver Dollar Jim" for throwing coins to passersby on the street.

Entertainment
 Silver Dollar (film), a 1932 film starring Edward G. Robinson.
 "Silver Dollar", hit song sung by Teresa Brewer

See also
 Dollar coin
 Eucalyptus cinerea, the silver dollar tree
 Lunaria, the silver dollar plant